Easy Chinese:San Francisco is a Cooking Channel show hosted by Ching He Huang. Ching explores all that San Francisco and the Bay Area have to offer by visiting local markets, farms and suppliers.

External links
 Official Easy Chinese San Francisco/Cooking Channel Website
 Lion TV USA Production Information
 Chinese food, Ching's way/Northside San Francisco

American cooking television series
Food and drink in the San Francisco Bay Area